Epochrinopsis is a genus of the family Tephritidae, better known as fruit flies.

Species
Epochrinopsis bicolorata Hering, 1939
Epochrinopsis rivellioides Hering, 1961

References

Tephritinae
Tephritidae genera
Diptera of South America